Kisar Varzal (also Romanized as Kīsār Varzal and Keysārvarzal) is a village in Lakan Rural District, in the Central District of Rasht County, Gilan Province, Iran. At the 2006 census, its population was 419, in 96 families.

References 

Populated places in Rasht County